Velika Ivanča is a village situated in Mladenovac municipality in Serbia.

2013 Velika Ivanča shooting

Velika Ivanča was the site of one of the deadliest spree shootings in modern-day Serbia. The shootings occurred in the early hours of 9 April 2013, when a gunman killed thirteen people, including six men, six women, and a two-year-old boy, before he tried to kill himself and his wife. They were both taken to hospitals in critical condition. The shooter, Ljubiša Bogdanović, died from his injuries two days later, while his wife survived.

Notable people
 Ljubiša Preletačević, Serbian political activist
 Milorad M. Petrović, Serbian poet (1875–1921)

References

Populated places in Serbia
Villages in Serbia